Avitus Bernard "Vedie" Himsl (April 2, 1917 – March 15, 2004) was an American professional baseball player, manager, coach and scout.  Born in Plevna, Montana, Himsl was a member of the class of 1938 from Saint John's University in Collegeville, Minnesota.

Career
A right-handed pitcher in minor league baseball in his playing days (1938–42; 1946; 1950–51), he peaked at the top level of the minors with the St. Paul Saints of the American Association, where he won 51 games over four seasons.

Himsl managed and scouted for the St. Louis Cardinals' organization before joining the Chicago Cubs in the mid-1950s as a scout and minor league skipper. In , he was named to the coaching staff of the MLB Cubs, when the team struggled to a 60–94 record, one game out of last place in the National League. The offseason resulted in a management overhaul and owner Philip K. Wrigley's creation of the College of Coaches, in which (rather than hiring a full-time manager) all of the team's coaches would rotate as "head coach" of the Major League Cubs and their farm teams.

Himsl was named the first head coach in the history of the College of Coaches. He posted a 10–21 win–loss record (.323) over three different terms during the  season (April 11–23; May 12–30; June 5–7). His first term, from Opening Day through the club's first 11 games, produced a 5–6 mark. But in his subsequent turns as the Cubs' pilot, the team lost 15 out of 20 games. Himsl also spent part of the 1961 season managing the Cubs' Wenatchee Chiefs affiliate in the Class B Northwest League.  He coached for the Cubs through , although he spent all of that campaign as the manager of the Triple-A Salt Lake City Bees of the Pacific Coast League.

In 1965, Himsl turned to scouting and front-office administration in the Chicago organization, with time out for two years as director of MLB's Central Scouting Bureau, and retired in 1985 as the Cubs' director of scouting. He was listed as a scouting consultant for the Cubs as late as 1999,  and continued to live in Chicago until his death in 2004.

References

External links

Major League coaching/head coaching page from Retrosheet
Watterson, Jeremy, Vedie Himsl. Society for American Baseball Research Biography Project

1917 births
2004 deaths
Alexandria Aces players
Baseball coaches from Montana
Baseball players from Montana
Chicago Cubs coaches
Chicago Cubs executives
Chicago Cubs managers
Chicago Cubs scouts
College of Saint Benedict and Saint John's University alumni
Hamilton Cardinals players
Major League Baseball pitching coaches
Major League Baseball scouting directors
Minor league baseball managers
People from Fallon County, Montana
St. Louis Cardinals scouts
St. Paul Saints (AA) players